Municipal elections were held in the Canadian province of British Columbia on November 19, 2011. Races were held in all municipalities and regional district electoral areas.

Selected mayoral races are as follows:

Abbotsford

Burnaby

Campbell River

Castlegar

Central Saanich

Chilliwack

Coldstream

Colwood

Comox

Coquitlam

Courtenay

Cranbrook

Dawson Creek

Delta

Esquimalt

Fort St. John

Hope

Kamloops

Kelowna

Lake Country

Langford

Langley (city)

Langley Township
Mel Kositsky announced that he would run for mayor on September 11, 2011. In November, there was a political debate between the mayoral candidates for both Langley City and Langley Township. Kositsky spent $70,254 on his political campaign, while Jack Froese, who won the election, had spent $79,533.

Maple Ridge

Mission

Nanaimo

Nelson

New Westminster

North Cowichan

North Saanich

North Vancouver City

North Vancouver District

Oak Bay

Parksville

Penticton

Pitt Meadows

Port Alberni

Port Coquitlam

Port Moody

Powell River

Prince George

Prince Rupert

Richmond

Saanich

Salmon Arm

Sidney

Smithers

Sooke

Squamish

Summerland

Surrey

The main opposition party, the Surrey Civic Coalition did not field a mayoral candidate against Watts. They did run a slate for city council, however, but did not win any seats.

Terrace

Vancouver

Vernon

Victoria

West Kelowna

West Vancouver

Williams Lake

White Rock

References

Bibliography
CivicInfo BC
Unofficial results

2011 elections in Canada
Municipal elections in British Columbia
2011 in British Columbia